Cotachena alysoni is a moth in the family Crambidae. It was described by Whalley in 1961. It is found in China.

References

Moths described in 1961
Spilomelinae